Roger Lockyer (27 November 1927 – 28 October 2017) was an English historian, academic, and writer. He had been educated at Pembroke College, Cambridge. He was a reader in history at Royal Holloway, University of London for many years, specialising in research and writing on the Tudor (1471-1603) and Stuart (1603-1714) periods.

Major works

 Tudor and Stuart Britain, by Roger Lockyer, 3rd edition, London 2004, Pearson. online
The first edition of this book, covering the period from 1471 to 1714, was published in 1964, and a second edition appeared in 1985. This work is considered a standard reference for this period in English history, covering the full range of Tudor and Stuart rulers.

 James VI and I, by Roger Lockyer, 2nd edition, London 1998, Longman.
James I was the first Stuart king of England.

 The Early Stuarts: The Political History of England 1603-1642, by Roger Lockyer, London 1999, Longman.
 Buckingham, the Life and Political Career of George Villiers, First Duke of Buckingham, 1592-1628, by Roger Lockyer, London 1981, Longman.
George Villiers was a favourite of King James I.

Personal life
On 21 December 2005, Lockyer entered into a civil partnership with Percy Stevens, his life partner of 39 years, at the registry office in Westminster, London. On 26 June 2014 they were among the first couples to legally convert their civil partnership into a marriage.

He died on 28 October 2017 at the age of 89.

References

1927 births
2017 deaths
English historians
Academics of Royal Holloway, University of London
Writers from London
British gay writers
LGBT historians
English LGBT people
Alumni of Pembroke College, Cambridge